Typhoon Andy, known in the Philippines as Typhoon Iliang, was an intense tropical cyclone that made landfall in Taiwan. Andy formed along the northern edge of the monsoon trough south of Guam on July 22, 1982. It became a tropical storm the next day, although this system was initially poorly organized. Andy moved steadily west during the first few days of its life. After looping south of Guam, the cyclone moved northwest and strengthened. Andy turned westward near the 18th parallel on July 25. However, the typhoon struck southern Taiwan on July 29. Continuing westward through the Formosa Strait, the storm made its final landfall in southern China on July 30 and dissipated inland two days later.

During its formative stages, the typhoon brought high waves to Guam, resulting in one death. Twelve families were also left homeless. After passing near Taiwan, Andy brought strong winds, which resulted in thirteen deaths and two others were rendered missing. Government offices, schools and airports were closed. At least 60 fishing boats in harbors were badly damaged or wrecked due to strong winds. A total of 300 power poles were brought down; consequently, nearly a quarter of Taiwan residents lost power at the height of the storm. After moving ashore in China, Andy brought heavy rains to nearby Hong Kong.

Meteorological history

Typhoon Andy originated from a monsoon trough south of Guam in tandem with Typhoon Bess. Despite strong wind shear, three areas of disturbed weather soon developed. The westernmost of the three drifted westward and remained poorly defined. Late on July 21, a Tropical Cyclone Formation Alert (TCFA) was issued for the middle system following a drop in barometric pressure and an increase in organization. Around this time, the Japan Meteorological Agency (JMA) started watching the cyclone. On July 22, the JMA upgraded the system into a tropical storm. Based on this, the Joint Typhoon Warning Center (JTWC) classified the system as a tropical storm and named it Andy. Despite the initial overall lack of organization, Andy slowly gained strength while tracking generally westward. However, the low-level circulation was initially poorly defined and difficult to find via weather satellite imagery. After performing a small loop, Andy accelerated northwest south of a subtropical ridge. According to the JMA, Andy attained typhoon intensity midday on July 24.

For the ensuing 24 hours, intensification was slight. Thereafter, Andy turned west and entered a more favorable environment for intensification.

Shortly after its peak, Andy began to slowly weaken. Nevertheless, the JTWC kept the intensity over  until landfall, which occurred later that day along the southeastern quadrant of Taiwan. Despite briefly emerging into the Formosa Strait, the JMA downgraded Andy into a severe tropical storm just before landfall in Southern China. On July 30, the JTWC stopped watching Andy inland over the mountains terrain of southeastern China. Two days later, the JMA followed suit.

Preparations and impact
While strengthening, Typhoon Andy passed near Guam, generating  waves along south-facing beaches. An 11-year-old boy died in Naval Station after the waves swept him off of rocks. Three "huge" waves struck the shoreline near Umatac, which destroyed several homes off of their foundation. Along many nearby villages, scattered damage was noted. At least nine villages were without power for varying amounts of time. In all, 12 people were left homeless.

While affecting Taiwan, Typhoon Andy snapped trees and toppled billboards, in addition to generating high waves. In some places, rainfall reached . Coastal areas were hardest hit. Along the southern portion of the island, 300 power poles were downed, making damage reports difficult for the United Press International to obtain. At the height of the storm, a quarter of the nation's 18 million residents were left without power. Eight people were killed in storm-related accidents, including a man and a woman who died when a car flipped in the central portion of the country. Furthermore, four members of a fishing party were swept out to sea and drowned and an elderly man was blown off a roof as he tried to fix leaks in it. Another 11-year-old boy was swept into the sea and was presumed to have perished while watching waves near the southeastern city of Taitung, though his 16-year-old companion who was also watching the waves was swept away, but was later rescued. In Taipei, broken trees and signboards fell on streets due to strong winds. Government offices, schools and airports were closed. One quarter of the city lost power. At least 60 fishing boats in harbors were badly damaged or wrecked in the wind. Elsewhere, a 23-man crew was forced to abandon a  ship off the northern Philippines. Overall, 13 people were killed, 2 were missing, and 25 others were wounded. A total of 300 homes were at least partially destroyed but no major damage was observed and no major flooding was reported.

While Andy was in Taiwan Straits, a No 1. hurricane signal was issued for Hong Kong on July 28. The next day, this was upgraded to a No. 3 hurricane signal. All signals were dropped after Andy weakened to a tropical storm. Tate's Cairn observed  of rain during the passage of the storm, the highest in the vicinity of Hong Kong. Overall, damage in Hong Kong was minor.

See also

 Typhoon Wayne (1983)
 Typhoon Winnie (1997)
 Typhoon Soudelor (2015)

Notes

References

1982 Pacific typhoon season
Typhoons in Taiwan
Typhoons
Andy